Restigouche-La-Vallée was a provincial electoral district in New Brunswick, Canada.

It was created in 2006 as a result of a merger of the old district of Madawaska-la-Vallée with the district of Restigouche West, less small portions on the extreme edges of both districts.

History

The district was first used in the 2006 provincial general election and featured a battle of incumbents.  Percy Mockler, the Progressive Conservative MLA from Madawaska-la-Vallée defeated Burt Paulin, the Liberal MLA from Restigouche West.

On December 18, 2008, Percy Mockler was appointed to the Senate of Canada on the advice of Prime Minister of Canada Stephen Harper.  As a result, a by-election was to be called no later than May 2009.

Premier of New Brunswick Shawn Graham called the by-election on February 6, 2009, and the vote was held March 9, 2009.  The Progressive Conservative candidate was Jean-Paul Soucy, the only one to come forward and a former aide to Mockler, and the Liberal candidate was former Restigouche West MLA Burt Paulin.  The NDP candidate was Alain Martel.

One local campaign issue concerned whether and how much government should support the forestry company J. D. Irving.  Former PC leader and nearby MLA Jeannot Volpé criticized the Liberal government for being too supportive of the company, which is a major employer in the riding of Restigouche-La Vallée.  Conservative candidate Jean-Paul Soucy indicated that he disagreed with Volpé's position, while Liberal candidate Burt Paulin said he was surprised that Volpé would criticize one of the largest employers in the region.

Members of the Legislative Assembly

Election results

References

External links 
Website of the Legislative Assembly of New Brunswick
Map of Restigouche-La-Vallée as of 2010 from Elections NB

Former provincial electoral districts of New Brunswick